Yehualeye Beletew Mitiku (born 31 July 1998) is an Ethiopian race walker. She competed in the women's 20 kilometres walk event at the 2016 Summer Olympics. In 2019, she competed in the women's 20 kilometres walk event at the 2019 World Athletics Championships held in Doha, Qatar. She finished in 16th place. She competed in the women's 20 kilometres walk event at the 2020 Summer Olympics.

References

External links
 

1998 births
Living people
Ethiopian female racewalkers
Place of birth missing (living people)
Athletes (track and field) at the 2016 Summer Olympics
Olympic athletes of Ethiopia
Athletes (track and field) at the 2019 African Games
African Games medalists in athletics (track and field)
African Games bronze medalists for Ethiopia
African Championships in Athletics winners
Athletes (track and field) at the 2020 Summer Olympics